Richard Travers Dixon (20 November 1865 – 14 November 1949) was a British sailor who competed in the 1908 Summer Olympics. He was a crew member of the British boat Heroine, which won the gold medal in the seven metre class.

References

External links
Olympic profile

1865 births
1949 deaths
British male sailors (sport)
Sailors at the 1908 Summer Olympics – 7 Metre
Olympic sailors of Great Britain
Olympic gold medallists for Great Britain
Olympic medalists in sailing
Medalists at the 1908 Summer Olympics
20th-century British people